Akbar Bintang Cahyono (born 12 April 1996) is an Indonesian badminton player affiliated with Djarum badminton club. He started his career in badminton when he was in the elementary school in 2005, and later joined the Ganesha badminton club in Serang. He entered Djarum club after success to compete in scholarship audition in 2015, and was selected to join the national team in January 2017. Cahyono competed the 2017 National Championships held in Pangkal Pinang  as a unseeded player in the mixed doubles senior event with Winny Oktavina Kandow, and the duo seize the national mixed doubles title.

Cahyono won his first international title at the 2018 Finnish Open in the men's doubles event partnered with Muhammad Reza Pahlevi Isfahani. In the mixed doubles event he clinched his first title with Winny Oktavina Kandow after won the Super 100 event 2018 Hyderabad Open.

Career

2023 
In January, Cahyono and his partner Marsheilla Gischa Islami competed at the home tournament, Indonesia Masters, but had to lose in the qualifying round from junior Chinese pair Jiang Zhenbang and Wei Yaxin. In the next tournament, they lost in the quarter-finals of the Thailand Masters from Japanese pair Hiroki Midorikawa and Natsu Saito.

Achievements

BWF World Tour (2 titles, 1 runner-up) 
The BWF World Tour, which was announced on 19 March 2017 and implemented in 2018, is a series of elite badminton tournaments sanctioned by the Badminton World Federation (BWF). The BWF World Tours are divided into levels of World Tour Finals, Super 1000, Super 750, Super 500, Super 300 (part of the HSBC World Tour), and the BWF Tour Super 100.

Men's doubles

Mixed doubles

BWF International Challenge/Series (2 titles, 3 runners-up) 
Men's doubles

Mixed doubles

  BWF International Challenge tournament
  BWF International Series tournament

Performance timeline

Individual competitions

Senior level

Men's doubles

Mixed doubles

References

External links
 

1996 births
Living people
People from Sukoharjo Regency
Sportspeople from Central Java
Indonesian male badminton players